Place Charles de Gaulle, historically known as the Place de l'Étoile, is a large road junction in Paris, France, the meeting point of twelve straight avenues (hence its historic name, which translates as "Square of the Star") including the Champs-Élysées. It was renamed in 1970, following the death of President Charles de Gaulle. It is still often referred to by its original name; the nearby Métro and RER station retains the designation Charles de Gaulle–Étoile. Paris's Axe historique ("historical axis") cuts through the Arc de Triomphe, which stands at the centre of Place Charles de Gaulle.

History 

The original name of the area was the Butte Chaillot ("Chaillot mound", named after the locality). At the time it was the point of convergence of several hunting trails. The Marquis de Marigny constructed monumental roadworks, completed in 1777, on the mound when he was establishing the plantations along the Champs-Élysées. The junction included paving of the road in the form of a star, as it still exists today and became known as the Place de l'Étoile.

In 1787, the Wall of the Ferme générale (Mur des Fermiers généraux), and the two buildings of the Barrière de l'Étoile (also known as the Barrière de Neuilly) were built to the design of Claude Nicolas Ledoux for the collection of the octroi tax at the entrance to Paris. They were located on either side of the Place de l'Étoile until their demolition after 1859.

Between 1806 and 1836, the Arc de Triomphe de l'Étoile was built to the design of Jean Chalgrin. It was originally commissioned by Emperor Napoleon I during the First French Empire and inaugurated three decades later by King Louis Philippe I under the July Monarchy.

The avenues radiating from the Place de l'Étoile were created during the Second French Empire of Emperor Napoleon III as part of Haussmann's renovation of Paris. The square was completely redesigned with avenues de Bezons (now Wagram), Joséphine (now Marceau), Kléber, de Saint-Cloud (now Victor-Hugo), Essling (now Carnot), Prince-Jérôme (now Mac-Mahon and Niel) forming with the Champs-Élysées and other existing avenues a star around the Arc de Triomphe.

In 1864, the circular street surrounding the Place de l'Étoile was named Rue de Presbourg (south of the Axe historique) and Rue de Tilsitt (north of the Axe historique), after the diplomatic successes of Napoleon which led to the signing of the Treaty of Presbourg in 1805 and the Treaties of Tilsit in 1807.

Since 1921, beneath the Arc de Triomphe lies the Tomb of the Unknown Soldier. After the death of President Charles de Gaulle in 1970, the Place de l'Étoile was renamed Place Charles de Gaulle.

Description

Map 

It is the second largest square in Paris, after the Place de la Concorde (8.64 hectares). At the centre of the square stands the Arc de Triomphe, which is accessible via a pedestrian underpass, to avoid the confluence of vehicular traffic from the juncture of twelve radiating avenues.

Avenues 

The twelve avenues, clockwise from the north, are the following:

 Avenue de Wagram (thus called since the Second Empire) and Boulevard de l'Étoile or Boulevard Bezons before
 Avenue Hoche: Avenue de la Reine-Hortense during the Second Empire and Boulevard Monceau before
 Avenue de Friedland since the Second Empire and Boulevard Beaujon before
 Avenue des Champs-Élysées
 Avenue Marceau: Avenue Joséphine during the Second Empire
 Avenue d'Iéna
 Avenue Kléber: Avenue du Roi-de-Rome during the Second Empire and Boulevard de Passy before
 Avenue Victor-Hugo: Avenue d'Eylau during the Second Empire and Avenue de Saint-Cloud before
 Avenue Foch: Avenue du Bois during the Third Republic and Avenue de l'Impératrice during the Second Empire
 Avenue de la Grande Armée during the Second Empire and Avenue de Neuilly before
 Avenue Carnot: Avenue d'Essling during the Second Empire
 Avenue Mac-Mahon: Avenue du Prince-Jérôme during the Second Empire

Axes 

The Place Charles de Gaulle is symmetrical and thus has six axes:

 Axis Avenue de Wagram and Avenue Kléber
 Axis Avenue Hoche and Avenue Victor-Hugo
 Axis Avenue de Friedland and Avenue Foch
 Axis Avenue des Champs-Élysées and Avenue de la Grande Armée which is the Axe historique of Paris
 Axis Avenue Marceau and Avenue Carnot
 Axis Avenue d'Iéna and Avenue Mac-Mahon

Arrondissements 
The Place Charles de Gaulle (as well as the Arc de Triomphe) is split between the 8th, 16th and 17th arrondissements of Paris. The 8th arrondissement encompasses the area between Avenue de Wagram and Avenue Marceau (to the east). The 16th arrondissement encompasses the area between Avenue Marceau and Avenue de la Grande Armée (to the south and west). The 17th arrondissement encompasses the area between Avenue de la Grande Armée and Avenue de Wagram (to the north).

Literature 
La Place de l'Étoile is the title of a novel by French writer Patrick Modiano.

Transportation 
Located near the Métro station: Charles de Gaulle–Étoile.
The Place Charles de Gaulle is served by Métro and RER services. Line 1, as well as RER A, run under the Avenue de la Grande Armée and Champs-Élysées and stop at the station; it also serves as western terminus for Line 2 and Line 6.

Gallery

See also 

 Squares in Paris
 Axe historique

References

External links 
 Satellite image from Google Maps

Charles de Gaulle
Roundabouts and traffic circles
National squares
Buildings and structures in the 8th arrondissement of Paris
Buildings and structures in the 16th arrondissement of Paris
Buildings and structures in the 17th arrondissement of Paris